List of Bien de Interés Cultural landmarks in the Province of Huesca, Aragon, northeastern Spain.

List 
 Casbas Monastery
 Jaca Cathedral

References 

 
Huesca
Aragonese culture
Bien de Interés Cultural landmarks in Aragon